Inhauna is a village and corresponding in Singhpur block of Rae Bareli district, Uttar Pradesh, India. As of 2011, its population is 13,049, in 2,021 households. Located at the junction of the Raebareli-Rudauli and Lucknow-Jaunpur roads, Inhauna is an old town that once served as the seat of a pargana as well as (briefly) a tehsil, and it has the ruins of an old fort built under the Nawabs of Awadh. The old marketplace, known as Ratanganj, was built in 1863 by the tahsildar Ratan Narain. Markets are held twice per week, on Mondays and Thursdays, and most of the trade is in livestock.

History
Inhauna is listed in the late-16th-century Ain-i-Akbari as a mahal in the sarkar of Awadh. It kept this status under the Nawabs of Awadh, under whom a fort was built in the southern part of the village. After the British annexed Oudh State in 1856, Inhauna was made a tehsil headquarters in Sultanpur district. It lost this status in 1869, when it was transferred to Raebareli district as part of a greater administrative reshuffling. Under this new arrangement, Inhauna became part of Maharajganj tehsil. With the tehsil headquarters and police station relocated, Inhauna declined somewhat from a population of 3,974 in 1869 to 3,373 in 1901.

At the turn of the 20th century, Inhauna was described as the only sizeable town in the pargana. It was surrounded by orchards and had a post office, a cattle pound, and a middle vernacular school. To the north of the road to Lucknow was a military encamping ground.

The 1961 census recorded Inhauna as comprising 12 hamlets, with a total population of 4,024 people (2,017 male and 2,007 female), in 906 households and 854 physical houses. The area of the village was given as 2,236 acres. Average attendance of the twice-weekly market was listed as about 3,000 people.

The 1981 census recorded Inhauna as having a population of 4,905 people, in 1,198 households, and having an area of 851.05 hectares.

References

Villages in Raebareli district